Solid Frog is an indie band based in Detroit, Michigan. They were formed in 1995 and released two albums: Supercoat (1995) and Pepperspray (1997) on Overture Records, Novi, Michigan. The band enjoyed some radio success with their first album, especially the song "Standard Day". Their second album Pepperspray received some airtime.  They continue to tour and perform live shows around the Midwest.

Three of its band members, Andy Patalan, Mike Purcell and Kyle Neely, also went on to form the band  Throttlebody in 2000, after which they released a self-titled album in 2002.

Two of its members, Andy Patalan and Kyle Neely, joined the Detroit-based band Sponge in 2004.

As of 1999, Overture/Overcore Records has a manufacturing and distribution deal with TVT Records.

References

External links
Throttlebody
Sponge

Indie rock musical groups from Michigan
Musical groups from Detroit
Musical groups established in 1995